Julius Reinhardt (born 29 March 1988) is a German former professional footballer who played as a midfielder.

Career 
Reinhardt joined the first team of Chemnitzer FC in 2007 and quickly became a regular for Chemnitz. After Chemnitz' 2009–10 Regionalliga Nord campaign, in which the club finished in third place, Reinhardt transferred to then 3. Liga club Eintracht Braunschweig. During his first season in Braunschweig the club won promotion to the 2. Bundesliga. After the 2011–12 2. Bundesliga season, he left Braunschweig and joined Kickers Offenbach in the 3. Liga. He signed for 1. FC Heidenheim a year later. On 19 June 2016, Reinhardt transferred back to Chemnitzer FC for an undisclosed fee. On 1 July 2018, Reinhardt transferred to FSV Zwickau.

References

External links 
 
 Reinhardt at Chemnitzer Official Website

1988 births
Living people
Sportspeople from Chemnitz
Footballers from Saxony
German footballers
Germany youth international footballers
Association football midfielders
2. Bundesliga players
3. Liga players
Chemnitzer FC players
Eintracht Braunschweig players
Eintracht Braunschweig II players
Kickers Offenbach players
1. FC Heidenheim players
VfB Fortuna Chemnitz players